Paramount Network is a brand of several television channels operated by Paramount International Networks that showcase the Paramount Pictures film catalogue, and selected TV series from Paramount Global's television productions. The channel was first launched in Spain on March 30, 2012, and in the years since, the channel has operated in a number of territories across Europe, East Africa, Latin America and Asia. It was formerly known as the Paramount Channel (which is still used in France).

History

As Paramount Channel

To date, Paramount Channel has launched in Spain in March 2012, France in September 2013, Hungary in February 2014, Russia in January 2014, Romania on January 14, 2014, Latin America in September 1995 until 2003, but returns again in the brand new look of November 2014, Sweden in December 2014, Poland in March 2015, Italy and Thailand in February and May 2016, and in the Middle East in April 2017.

Relaunch
In May 2018, Viacom announced that the original Paramount Channel in Spain would relaunch as a local version of the U.S Paramount Network, switching to a general entertainment format with television series and films. The same relaunch as the Paramount Network occurred in Italy on March 16, 2019, and in Latin America on April 14, 2020. On October 20, 2020, it was announced that the Hungarian version would also rebrand as the Paramount Network, and the rebranding date was confirmed on November 23 that year. Paramount Channel in Hungary rebranded as the Paramount Network on December 17, 2020. In December 2020, ViacomCBS announced Prima Comedy Central in the Czech Republic will be rebranded as Paramount Network. Paramount Network launched effectively on January 12, 2021. On January 26, 2021, it was announced on the Paramount Channel Asia official Facebook page that ViacomCBS announced that the Paramount Channel in Thailand, Malaysia, and the Pacific Islands (including the Philippines) was to be rebranded as Paramount Network on February 1, 2021.

Following the beginning of the launch of Paramount+ in March 2021, and its international expansion, this has led to Paramount Global to close the Paramount Network channels operating in the Nordic countries by the end of 2021, to put more resources towards Paramount+.

In August 2021, Paramount Networks International agreed a deal with Comcast Corporation's Sky Group to launch the Paramount+ streaming service in various European markets via Sky's set-top boxes and devices. To reduce overall branding confusion with Paramount+, Paramount Network in the UK was rebranded as 5Action on 19 January 2022, without any overall changes to its programme schedule.

Less than two weeks before the UK rebranding, rumors begin to surge about Paramount Network and Spike in Italy closing on January 17, 2022. This was later confirmed, with Mediaset acquiring the positions left unused on DTT, and Paramount Network being replaced with the channel Twentyseven.

Following the Russian invasion of Ukraine, all the channels under the control of Paramount Global were discontinued from Russia, including the Paramount Channel, on April 28, 2022. The channel would, however, continue broadcasting in CIS regions and Ukraine, until it was permanently discontinued on January 4, 2023, leaving France as the only region still using the Paramount Channel name instead of Paramount Network, and coincidentally the only region in Europe where the channel coexists alongside Paramount+.

Programming
Launched in September 1995, The Paramount Channel was originally transmitted in Latin America as the launch day and primarily broadcast TV shows such as drama, sitcoms and animated TV shows.

The original Paramount Channel in Spain primarily broadcast films from the 1980s and 1990s, as well as recent television series. The international versions that followed shared a similar format but never the same programming. For instance, films from the 1950s, 1960s, 1970s were broadcast in France, recent TV series and 1990s and 2000s films were broadcast in Italy, and films and TV series from the 1930s, 1970s, 1980s, 2000s, and 2010s were broadcast in Hungary, Poland, Romania, Czech Republic, Russia, the Middle East, Latin America, and Southeast Asia. In addition to airing films, some versions in other countries are also airing combat sporting events from mixed martial arts promotion Bellator MMA.

Following the rebranding of the channel (along with international Spike channels) as Paramount Network, it now adds series from its U.S. domestic counterpart as well as from the television production companies of ViacomCBS and from acquisition of syndicated programming. In some countries, shows from Comedy Central are also aired on the channel.

List of Channels
An asterisk (*) indicates that the channel was formerly a Spike brand.

A double-asterisk (**)  indicates that the channel was formerly a Paramount Channel brand.

EMAA & Australia
 5Action/Paramount Network UK (2018) - (now part of Channel 5)
 Paramount Network France (2013)
 Paramount Network Poland (2011–15 as Viacom Bink!; 2014)**
 Paramount Network Asia (2021)
 Paramount Network Czech Republic - formerly Comedy Central from 2015 to 2021
 Paramount Network Hungary (2020)* - formerly RTL Spike (Licensed by RTL Group)
 Paramount Network Spain (2012)**
 Paramount Network Netherlands (2015)*

The Americas
Paramount Network USA (1983)*
 Paramount Network Latin America (2014)**
Paramount Network Brazil (2014)**

Defunct Channels
 Paramount Channel Arabia (2017–20)
 Paramount Network Austria (2018–21)
 Paramount Network Denmark (2019–22) – formerly Comedy Central from 2014 to 2019
 Paramount Network Finland (2019–22)
 Paramount Network Italy (2016–2019; 2019–22)**
 Spike Italy (2019–2022) – This channel coexisted alongside Paramount Network in Italy
 Paramount Network Sweden (2009) – formerly Comedy Central from 2009 to 2019
 Spike Australia (2016–22)
 Paramount Channel Russia and CIS (2014–23)

References

Paramount Network
Paramount International Networks
Television channels in North Macedonia
Paramount Pictures